FTV One, is a digital television channel operated by Formosa Television (FTV) in Taiwan. It is formerly called Follow Me TV and aimed to offer realtime traffic information to audiences, especially drivers with TV device on vehicle.

External links
  (official website)

2004 establishments in Taiwan
Television channels and stations established in 2004
Television stations in Taiwan